Voutsaras (before 1918: Ζαΐμη - Zaimi) is a village in the municipal unit of Falaisia in Arcadia, Greece. It is situated in low hills, 11 km southeast of Megalopoli. It is 3 km southwest of Anavryto, 5 km east of Leontari and 5 km northwest of Skortsinos. Voutsara had a population of 47 in 2011.

Population

See also
List of settlements in Arcadia

References

External links
History and information about Voutsaras
 Voutsaras GTP Travel Pages

Falaisia
Populated places in Arcadia, Peloponnese